Jesús Eduardo Compeán Gonzalez (born 23 January 1989) is a Mexican footballer who plays as a defender for Canadian Soccer League club FC Vorkuta.

Playing career

Mexico 
Compeán played in the Segunda División de México in 2011 with Cruz Azul Jasso. He played in the Ascenso MX with Cruz Azul Hidalgo, and made his debut on 21 August 2011 against Irapuato F.C. In 2012, he returned to the Segunda Division to play with Real Cuautitlán. He also played with Albinegros de Orizaba, and Potros UAEM.

Canada 
In 2019, he played abroad in the Canadian Soccer League with Scarborough SC. In 2020, he was featured in the CSL Championship final against FC Vorkuta but was defeated by a score of 2–1.

The following season he played with league rivals Vorkuta. He assisted in securing Vorkuta's third regular-season title and secured the ProSound Cup against Scarborough. He also played in the 2021 playoffs where Vorkuta was defeated by his former team Scarborough in the championship final.

Honours

Club
FC Vorkuta

 Canadian Soccer League Regular Season: 2021 
 ProSound Cup: 2021

References 

1989 births
Living people
Mexican footballers
Cruz Azul Hidalgo footballers
Albinegros de Orizaba footballers
Potros UAEM footballers
Scarborough SC players
FC Continentals players
Liga Premier de México players
Ascenso MX players
Canadian Soccer League (1998–present) players
Association football defenders
Mexican expatriate footballers
Mexican expatriate sportspeople in Canada
Expatriate soccer players in Canada
Footballers from Veracruz
People from Tantoyuca